The Allton Building is a historic building located at 160 E. Main St. in Jerome, Idaho. The commercial building was constructed in 1909 for landlord Maurice J. Allton. The back and side walls of the building were built with lava rock and are considered a good extant example of the use of lava rock for construction. The businesses which have occupied the building include a cinema, a bank, a drug store, a furniture store, a music store, and a dry cleaners.

The building was added to the National Register of Historic Places on September 8, 1983.

See also
 List of National Historic Landmarks in Idaho
 National Register of Historic Places listings in Jerome County, Idaho

References

1909 establishments in Idaho
Buildings and structures in Jerome County, Idaho
Commercial buildings completed in 1909
Commercial buildings on the National Register of Historic Places in Idaho
National Register of Historic Places in Jerome County, Idaho